Tapinoma emeryanum is a species of ant in the genus Tapinoma. Described by Nikolaj Nikolajevitsch Kuznetsov-Ugamsky in 1927, the species is endemic to Kazakhstan and Kyrgyzstan.

References

Tapinoma
Hymenoptera of Asia
Insects described in 1927